Parliamentary elections were held in Nauru on 23 January 1971. As there were no political parties, all candidates ran as independents. Following the election, Hammer DeRoburt was re-elected President by Members of the Parliament.

Campaign
A total of 48 candidates contested the 18 seats. In Anabar Constituency the two incumbent MPs were returned unopposed.

Results
Four sitting MPs were unseated in the election; Speaker Itubwa Amram, Asa Paul Diema, Totuwa Depaune and Derog Gioura.

Aftermath
Following the elections, Hammer DeRoburt was the only candidate for president, and was elected unopposed by the newly elected Parliament. MPs also elected Kenas Aroi as Speaker and Victor Eoaeo as Deputy Speaker.

DeRoburt's cabinet was unchanged from the previous parliamentary term with James Ategan Bop as Minister of Finance, Austin Bernicke as Minister for Health and Education, Joseph Detsimea Audoa as Minister of Justice and Buraro Detudamo as Minister of Works and Community Services and Minister Assistant to the President. DeRoburt held the portfolios of External Affairs, Internal Affairs and Island Development and Industry.

References

Nauru
1971 in Nauru
Elections in Nauru
Non-partisan elections
Election and referendum articles with incomplete results
January 1971 events in Oceania